This is a list of Private Passions episodes from 2015 to 2019. It does not include repeated episodes or compilations.

2015

2016

2017

2018

2019

References

External links

Lists of British radio series episodes